John Henry Goeke (October 28, 1869 – March 25, 1930) was a U.S. Representative from Ohio for two terms from 1911 to 1915.

Biography 
Born near Minster, Ohio, Goeke attended the common schools and was graduated from Pio Nono College in St. Francis, Wisconsin, in 1888. He studied law at Cincinnati Law School and was graduated in 1891. He was admitted to the bar in 1891 and commenced practice in St. Marys, Ohio. He was City solicitor of St. Marys 1892-1894. He served as prosecuting attorney of Auglaize County 1894-1900. He resumed the practice of law in Wapakoneta, Ohio, in 1900. He also served as a director of several banks and manufacturing concerns. He served as chairman of the Democratic State convention in 1903.

Goeke was elected as a Democrat to the Sixty-second and Sixty-third Congresses (March 4, 1911 – March 3, 1915). He was an unsuccessful candidate for renomination in 1914 to the Sixty-fourth Congress. He served as delegate to the Democratic National Conventions in 1912, 1920, 1924, and 1928. He resumed the practice of law in Wapakoneta, Ohio. He moved to Lima, Ohio, in 1921 and continued the practice of law. He died in Lima, Ohio, March 25, 1930. He was interred in Gethsemane Cemetery.

In November 1891, Goeke was married to Emma Kolter of Wapakoneta. They had two children. She and the children were accidentally asphyxiated by natural gas at home while Goeke was away.

In September, 1907, Goeke married Catherine Nichols. They had two daughters.

References

External sources

1869 births
1930 deaths
People from Wapakoneta, Ohio
University of Cincinnati College of Law alumni
County district attorneys in Ohio
Ohio lawyers
Democratic Party members of the United States House of Representatives from Ohio
People from Minster, Ohio